Sequoyah Heights is a smaller part of the Oak Knoll neighborhood that runs alongside the southeastern part of the Oakland hills. The neighborhood borders San Leandro.

Sequoyah Heights is one of East Oakland's safer and more well-to-do neighborhoods, and features a religious preschool and the Sequoyah Country Club. Sequoyah Heights neighbors the Grass Valley neighborhood, home of the Oakland Zoo, the Seminary neighborhood and the site of the now closed Oak Knoll Naval Hospital.

Neighborhoods in Oakland, California